Harjo is a surname, derived from the Muscogee word Hadcho meaning "Crazy" or "So Brave as to Seem crazy". 

Notable people with the name include:

 Albert Harjo (1937-2019), Muscogee artist
 Benjamin Harjo, Jr. (born 1945), Absentee Shawnee/Seminole painter and printmaker
 Chitto Harjo (Crazy Snake, 1846-1911), Muscogee warrior and activist
 Edmond Harjo (1917–2014), American Seminole Code Talker during World War II
 Joy Harjo (born 1951), Muscogee/Cherokee poet, musician, author, and U.S. Poet Laureate
 Osvald Harjo (born 1910), Norwegian resistance member
 Sharron Ahtone Harjo (born 1945), Kiowa painter
 Sterlin Harjo (born 1979), Seminole/Muscogee filmmaker and comedian
 Suzan Shown Harjo (born 1945), Muscogee/Cheyenne activist and policymaker

As middle name 

 Lois Harjo Ball (1906–1982), was a Muscogee painter
 William Harjo LoneFight (born 1966), is president and CEO of American Native Services

See also
 Harjo, Oklahoma, unincorporated community in the United States
 Tahnee Ahtoneharjo-Growingthunder, Kiowa beadwork artist, regalia maker, curator, and museum professional of Muscogee and Seminole descent
 Harju, a Finno–Norwegian surname

Notes

Native American surnames